Route 354 is a state highway in eastern Connecticut running from Colchester to Salem.

Route description
Route 354 begins as Parum Road at an intersection with Route 85 in the town center of Colchester and heads southeast. It intersects Route 2 after 0.4 with a partial interchangeat Exit 21. Route 354 continues southeast, becoming Deep River Road as it heads towards the town of Salem. In Salem, the road becomes Old Colchester Road and continues southeast to end at an intersection with Route 82 at the south side of Gardner Lake.

History
Route 354 was commissioned from SR 654 in 1963 and has had no significant changes since. SR 654 itself first became a state road in 1955. A proposal to extend it to Route 32 in Montville was rejected in 1973.

Junction list

References

External links

354
Transportation in New London County, Connecticut